The Rural Municipality of Waverley No. 44 is a rural municipality (RM) in the Canadian province of Saskatchewan within Census Division No. 3 and  Division No. 2. Located in the southwest portion of the province, it is adjacent to the United States border, neighbouring Valley County in Montana.

History 
The RM of Waverley No. 44 incorporated as a rural municipality on February 1, 1913.

Geography

Communities and localities 
The following unincorporated communities are within the RM.

Localities
Fir Mountain
Glentworth
Wood Mountain

Demographics 

Attractions 
The RM includes the eastern portion (or "East Block") of Grasslands National Park.

Government 
The RM of Waverley No. 44 is governed by an elected municipal council and an appointed administrator that meets on the second Tuesday of every month. The reeve of the RM is Lloyd Anderson while its administrator is Deidre Nelson. The RM's office is located in Glentworth.

References 

 
Waverley
Division No. 3, Saskatchewan